The Ligier JS P4 is a sports prototype race car, designed, developed, and produced by French manufacturer Onroak Automotive, and named in partnership with former French driver Guy Ligier, and built to LMP4 regulations, since 2018.

References 

Le Mans Prototypes
Ligier racing cars